Trachemys callirostris is a turtle in the family Emydidae found in Colombia and Venezuela.

Description 
The turtle's carapace is green with light colors with dark splotches between them. The head of the turtle includes yellow lines and a splotch behind their ears resembling pond slider(Trachemys scripta). On average they are 25 cm(10 in.). Larger specimens can are around 32 cm(12.5 in.), but have been as long as 35 cm(13.5 in.).

Taxonomy 
There are two subspecies recognized:
 Colombian slider (T. c. callirostris) 
 Venezuelan slider (T. c. chichiriviche)
The species was thought to be a subspecies of the pond slider(Trachemys scripta).

Distribution and habitat 
The species is found in Colombia and Venezuela. Many have been found in the Magdalena River. They live in slow rivers, lakes, swamps, ponds, and rafts and can tolerate brackish water to some extent. They live in areas with floating vegetation and logs to bask on.

The Colombian subspecies in lives in northern Colombia and Northwest Venezuela near the Antioquia Department(Colombia), Atlántico Department(Colombia), Bolívar Department(Colombia), Córdoba Department(Colombia), Cesar Department(Colombia), La Guajira Department(Colombia), Magdalena Department(Colombia), Zulia(Venezuela), and Falcón(Venezuela). The Venezuelan subspecies is found in small coastal river systems near Rio Tocuyo(Venezuela), Falcón(Venezuela), Rio Morón(Venezuela), and Carabobo(Venezuela).

Further reading 
Infotortuga: Trachemys callirostris, tortuga colombiana Website in Spanish, fairly accurate translation on Google Translate

References 

Trachemys
Turtles of South America
Reptiles of Colombia
Reptiles of Venezuela
Reptiles described in 1856
Taxa named by John Edward Gray